The Roman Catholic Diocese of Marília is a diocese located in the city of Marília in the Ecclesiastical province of Botucatu in Brazil.

History
 February 16, 1952: Established as Diocese of Marília from the Diocese of Lins

Bishops
 Bishops of Marília (Roman rite), in reverse chronological order:
 Bishop Luiz Antônio Cipolini (2013.05.08 - present)
 Bishop Osvaldo Giuntini (1992.12.09 – 2013.05.08)
 Bishop Daniel Tomasella, O.F.M. Cap. (1975.04.23 – 1992.12.09)
 Archbishop (personal title) Hugo Bressane de Araújo (1954.10.07 – 1975.04.23)

Coadjutor bishops
Daniel Arnaldo Tomasella, O.F.M. Cap. (1975)
Osvaldo Giuntini (1987-1992)

Auxiliary bishops
Daniel Arnaldo Tomasella, O.F.M. Cap. (1969-1975), appointed Coadjutor here
Osvaldo Giuntini (1982-1987), appointed Coadjutor here

Other priest of this diocese who became bishop
Paulo Roberto Beloto, appointed Bishop of Formosa, Goias in 2005

Sources
 GCatholic.org
 Catholic Hierarchy
 Diocese website

Roman Catholic dioceses in Brazil
Christian organizations established in 1952
Marilia, Roman Catholic Diocese of
Roman Catholic dioceses and prelatures established in the 20th century
Marília
1952 establishments in Brazil